Maximilian armour is a modern term applied to the style of early 16th-century German plate armour associated with, and possibly first made for the Emperor Maximilian I. The armour is still white armour, made in plain steel, but it is decorated with many flutings that may also have played a role in deflecting the points and blades of assailants and increasing the structural strength of the plates. It is a transitional stage in the decoration of armour, after the plain steel surfaces of 15th-century armour and before the elaborate decoration and colouring with etching and other techniques of Renaissance armour.  The armour is characterized by armets and close helmets with bellows visors; small fan-shaped narrow and parallel fluting—often covering most of the harness (but never the greaves); etching; work taken from woodcuts; sharply waisted cuirasses, and squared sabatons.

According to an alternative version, the name is related to Maximilian II, as the last Maximilian armour was made especially for him in 1557, seventeen years after it passed out of general use.

The armour was designed to imitate the pleated clothing that was considered fashionable in Europe at the time. Some armour combined long pleat-like fluting with lines of rectangular shapes imitating contemporary fabrics decorated with slashing or quilting.  A trend that developed in 15th and especially 16th-century Europe was to create armour that not only provided the maximum amount of protection, but was also visually pleasing. Maximilian armour combined the rounded Italian style of armour with the German fluted style.

Not every armour worn by Maximilian I was Maximilian-style armour. The most famous armour worn by Maximilian was Gothic-style armour, which was worn by Maximilian when he was a young prince and later presented as an honourable wedding gift for his uncle Sigmund. Maximilian I became emperor in 1493 and died in 1519, but classic Maximilian armour is known from 1515 to 1525, and similarly shaped armour with less or different fluting was produced from 1500.

Transitional Schott-Sonnenberg style 

Early types of Maximilian armour with either no fluting or wolfzähne (wolf teeth) style fluting (which differs from classic Maximilian fluting) and could be worn with a sallet are called Schott-Sonnenberg style armour by Oakeshott. This transitional armour was worn from 1500 to 1520, and true Maximilian armour was worn from 1515 to 1525. Some other historians do not fully separate Schott-Sonnenberg style from Maximilian armour.

Italian "alla tedesca" (a la German) armour 
Italian "alla tedesca" ("a la German") armour is an Italian armour of 1500–1515 with fluting and the Maximilan breast shape. Knee-long tassets were often worn with a bellows-visored sallet. This kind of armour is considered by Oakeshott to be a kind of Schott-Sonnenberg Style armour made by Italians for the German market.

Parallels with late (rounded) kastenbrust armour 

Such armour of the first half of the 15th century are separated by Oakeshott from kastenbrust armour as alwite armour. However, other historians consider it as a kind of kastenbrust armour.

Maximilian armour and fluted armour 

The terms Maximiliansharnisch (Maximilian armour) and Riefelharnisch (fluted armour) have been used interchangeably. There are debates over the connection between Maximilian I and fluted armour.  opines that fluted armour was only distributed after Maximilian's death and direct influence of the emperor cannot be proven. Franz Niehoff writes that the emperor did play a supporting role in the invention of the fluted armour and the term Maximiliansharnisch  can be used to highlight the contribution of the Innsbruck armour makers, and the role  of artists like Hans Leinberger should also be noted.  
Tilman Falk notes that the armour wore by a captain in Hans Burgkmair's work (1504) in the Basilica Santa Croce, classified by Weis-Liebersdorf as Maximiliansharnisch, was still in transitional phase in comparison with the later fluted armour style. Larry Silver agrees with Tilman Falk that there was an intimate connection between armour suits depicted in Maximilian's woodcut projects and the armours actually designed for him.  Armour designed by the Helmschmieds for Maximilian in particular increasingly favoured a "rounder and simpler form, termed 'classical' by the historians of armor, in contrast to the angularity of the 'baroque Gothic'. Dominated by overlapping, scalelike plates and more regular patterns of decoration, these suits because increasingly regularized and evolved into the Riefelharnisch."

Gallery

See also 
 Armour under the patronage of Maximilian I, in Cultural depictions of Maximilian I, Holy Roman Emperor
 Gothic plate armour
 Greenwich armour

References 

16th-century establishments in the Holy Roman Empire
Western plate armour
Early Modern armour
Maximilian I, Holy Roman Emperor